Kamala Devi may refer to:

 Kamala Devi (footballer) (born 1992), Indian footballer
 Kamala Devi (actress) (1933–2010), Indian actress who starred in American Westerns
 Kamala Devi Harris (born 1964), American politician and 49th vice president of the United States
 Kamaladevi Chattopadhyay (1903–1988), Indian social activist